Kurds in Belgium are Kurds living in Belgium. The number of Kurds is estimated between 7,100 and 25,000. Most Belgian Kurds live in the capital Brussels.

In 1993, population of Kurds in Belgium was estimated as 12,000 by Kurdish Institute of Paris (KIP). Today, KIP estimates the same number as 70,000. Almost all Kurds in Belgium are Muslim.

Kurdish Institute of Brussels was founded by a group of Belgian Kurds in 1978  with the goal of integration of the Kurdish community in the Belgian society.

See also 

 Kurdish diaspora
 Immigration to Belgium
 Kurdish Institute of Brussels
 Belgium–Kurdistan Region relations

References 

Kurdish diaspora in Europe
Ethnic groups in Belgium